The Takoma-Fort Totten Line designated as Route K2 is a Metrobus Route operated by the Washington Metropolitan Area Transit Authority between the Fort Totten Metro Station of the Red, Green, and Yellow Lines and Takoma Metro Station of the Red Line of the Washington Metro. The line operates every 20 minutes during weekday peak hours only with trips taking 15 minutes to complete.

Background
Route K2 operates between Fort Totten and Takoma stations during weekday peak hours only in both directions. Additional K2 trips operate at 1:34 pm when public schools are open. This route connects Fort Totten and Takoma residents via Lamond without having to take the expensive train during the peak-hours. Route K2 currently operates out of Bladensburg division but has operated out of Northern division at one point.

K2 stops

History
Route K2 was created as a brand new route by WMATA on February 19, 1978, to operate during the weekday peak-hours between the newly opened Fort Totten station and Takoma stations, plus to the Walter Reed Army Medical Center in the Shepherd Park neighborhood of Northwest Washington D.C. The new route will connect hospital workers to various to Metrorail stations without having to walk.

Route K2 will operate in a clockwise loop between Takoma and Walter Reed Army Medical Center during the AM peak-hours and a counter clockwise loop during the PM peak-hours and operate in both directions between Takoma and Fort Totten stations. Only hospital workers with a valid I.D. are allowed to ride inside the Walter Reed Army Medical Center. Passengers wishing to board/alight at the Medical Center would had to get off of stops along Georgia Avenue. The route only operates between Fort Totten and Takoma stations during the peak hours in the non peak direction.

On March 27, 2005, the K2 was split into two routes. The K2 loop between the Takoma station and Walter Reed Army Medical Center was renamed under a route K1 under the Takoma–Walter Reed Line. The new K1 will operate during the weekday peak-hours only and operate under the clockwise and counter clockwise loops the K2 had plus had the same restrictions at the Walter Reed Army Medical Center loop.

Route K2 would only operate its routing between Takoma station and Fort Totten station during the weekday peak-hours only. The route has not had any major changes since.

All K2 service was suspended beginning on March 16, 2020 due to the COVID-19 pandemic. Service resumed on August 23, 2020.

In February 2021, WMATA proposed to eliminate all K2 service if they did not get any federal funding.

References

K2